The singles discography of English singer Cliff Richard consists in excess of 200 singles, of which 159 singles have been released in the UK in varying vinyl, CD, cassette and digital formats. Listed alongside the UK singles in the discography below are a further 20 singles which were released in other territories, as well as 22 singles which were sung in German and only released in German-speaking countries.
 
Cliff Richard's debut single "Move It", recorded with his equally successful backing band the Drifters (later renamed the Shadows) was written by original guitarist Ian Samwell. It was released in August 1958, and was the first British rock and roll hit to make the UK Singles Chart top ten, reaching number two and spending 17 weeks on the chart. He achieved his first number one in August 1959 with his fifth single, "Living Doll", which spent six weeks at the summit while becoming the UK's highest selling single of 1959. From then, through to December 1963, Richard achieved 19 consecutive top-four singles, including seven number ones and a further six peaking at number two. Richard accumulated a total of 28 weeks at number one on the UK Singles Chart in this period. His biggest hit of this period, "The Young Ones", lifted from the film of the same name, debuted at number one on the charts, spent a total of six weeks at number one and went on to achieve the rare feat in the UK alone, of sales of over a million – it was only the sixth million seller in the UK and remains his highest selling single in the UK.

From 1964, despite the emerging dominance of the Beatles and beat music, Richard continued achieving top 10 hits throughout the 1960s although the frequency of top-five hits dropped off. In 1968, the track "Congratulations" was chosen to be his first Eurovision Song Contest entry, and although it came second in the contest, it became his biggest hit of the last half of the sixties, reaching number one in the UK and a number of European countries.

In the 1950s and 1960s, it is notable that singles were the dominant sales medium, generally far ahead of album sales. However, towards the end of the 1960s and into the 1970s, this shifted, with albums becoming dominant. For the first half of the 1970s, Richard struggled to achieve big hits, apart from his 1973 Eurovision Song Contest entry "Power to All Our Friends". It was not until 1975 that Richard changed the focus of his recording career from singles to albums, beginning with the recording of the I'm Nearly Famous album. It produced the lead single "Miss You Nights", released in late 1975 and "Devil Woman", which became his first US top-ten hit and biggest hit there. From this time, the singles were generally lifted from the albums, although not exclusively. In 1979, Richard's single "We Don't Talk Anymore" became the highest selling record of his career achieving worldwide sales over 4 million.

From the late 1970s through the 1980s and into the 1990s Richard not only continued to have many top 10 hit singles, including the seasonal number one '"Mistletoe and Wine" and with Saviour's Day" in 1990. Although from the mid-1990s Richard has suffered a lack of radio airplay, he still has continued to have success, rounding out the 1990s with the number one "The Millennium Prayer", Throughout the 2000s, he had top-five singles throughout the first decade, up until song downloads began to be included in the UK Singles Chart.

Richard has achieved 14 number one singles on the UK Singles Chart, including having the unique distinction of having two versions of the same song hitting number-one on the singles chart. "Living Doll" first topped the charts in 1959, then again 26 years later in a re-recording for the Comic Relief charity with the cast of British TV series The Young Ones. Richard also has the distinction of being the only artist to have achieved UK number-one singles in five consecutive decades, 1950s, 1960s, 1970s, 1980s and 1990s. Richard's sales of singles within the UK itself make him the highest selling British male solo artist of singles of all time.

Singles

1950s

1960s

1970s

1980s

1990s

2000s

2010s

2020s

German language

Other appearances (singles)

Duets
Cliff Richard has duetted on singles and albums with many singers during his career:

See also
 Cliff Richard albums discography
 Cliff Richard videography
 List of million-selling singles in the United Kingdom

Notes

References

External links
Cliff Richard Singles page 

Discographies of British artists
Rock music discographies
Pop music discographies
Singles discography